Aaron Warren O'Brien (born 2 October 1981) is an Australian cricketer. He has played first class cricket for New South Wales. He was Middleton Cricket Club's professional deputising for the injured Brendon Reddy for the match against Crompton.

O'Brien signed with South Australia for the 2008–2009 domestic season, to get regular playing opportunities.

See also
 List of New South Wales representative cricketers

References

External links
Cricinfo article

1981 births
Adelaide Strikers cricketers
Australian cricketers
Cricketers from Sydney
Kensington cricketers
Living people
New South Wales cricketers
South Australia cricketers
Melbourne Renegades cricketers